Plotter Kill is a river that flows into the Mohawk River east of Rotterdam Junction, New York.

References

Rivers of Schenectady County, New York
Rivers of New York (state)